Luke Walton (born 1980), is an American professional basketball coach and former player

Luke Walton may also refer to:

Luke Walton (rower) (born 1979), American Olympic rower
The Luke Walton Band, American alternative rock band from San Diego, California

See also
Luke Wilton, a member of the Parliament of England in the 15th century